Yakus is a surname. Notable people with the surname include:

 Milton Yakus (1917–1980), American songwriter
 Shelly Yakus (born 1945), American music engineer and mixer, son of Milton

See also
 Yakus v. United States, 1944 lawsuit